.gm is the country code top-level domain (CCTLD) of The Gambia.

Second-level domains

Registrations are taken directly at the second level, or at the third level beneath the following second level names:

A subregistry * .gov.gm for government entities is delegated to the Ministry of Communication, Information & IT (MoICI).  

A subregistry * .edu.gm  for educational institutions and resources is delegated to the University of The Gambia (UTG).

External links
IANA .gm whois information
.gm domain registration website

Country code top-level domains
Communications in the Gambia

sv:Toppdomän#G